"On verra" is a song by French hip hop artist Nekfeu and produced by BLV. It was released on May 1, 2015 as the second single from his debut studio album Feu. It entered the French Singles Chart at number 36 on May 9, 2015, and peaked at number 13.

Music video
A music video for the song was released on YouTube on 12 May 2015. It is 3 minutes and 25 seconds long.

Directed by Teva Vasseur, the video shows Nekfeu having fun with friends and rapping to the song in several locations across Paris, including a bridge with love locks, a party and a recording studio. It also features a number of his S-Crew cohorts, as well as French YouTube personality Mister V, and at certain points in the video Nekfeu and his friends are seen sporting merchandise of French football club Paris Saint-Germain.

Track listing
 Digital download
 "On verra" – 3:31

Chart performance

Certifications

References

2015 singles
2015 songs
Nekfeu songs
French-language songs
Seine Zoo singles
Polydor Records singles
Songs written by Nekfeu